Sleeps Society (stylised in all caps) is the fifth studio album by British metalcore band While She Sleeps. It was released on 16 April 2021, through the band's independent label Sleeps Brothers, in collaboration with Search and Destroy, Spinefarm Records, and Universal Music. The album was produced by Carl Bown and Sean Long, the band's lead guitarist.

Background and promotion
On 15 October 2020, the band released the first single and title track "Sleeps Society" along with an accompanying music video. That same day, the band announced the album itself, the album cover and release date. They also unveiled their new members subscription service called Sleeps Society via the Patreon platform. Through the service, fans will be able to contribute and subscribe with monthly donations to the band, and in turn contributors will have access to exclusive perks such as merchandise, secret shows, early access to tickets, podcasts, play throughs, tips, and more.

On 7 February 2021, the band released the second single "You Are All You Need", which debuted on Daniel P. Carter's BBC Radio 1's Rock Show. At the same time, the band revealed the official track list of the album. Guitarist Sean Long commented about the track: "We somehow managed to inject enough personal inspiration from each member for it to completely embody 'the Sleeps sound' with ease." On 18 March, one month before the album release, the band released the third single "Nervous" featuring Simon Neil of Biffy Clyro and its corresponding music video. On 14 April 2022, the band released the fourth single "Eye to Eye" while also announcing the deluxe edition of the album which is set to be released on 3 June. At the same time, the band officially revealed the album cover and the track list.

Critical reception

Sleeps Society received generally positive reviews from critics. Damon Taylor from Dead Press! rated the album positively calling it: "It's a fitting conclusion to a record that, admittedly, could not have been created without the unfathomable and relentless support of the fanbase – nay, community that they have nurtured. Broad in scope yet refusing to fall victim to quality control, Sleeps Society is not only a benchmark offering from While She Sleeps, but also one that puts them closer to the forefront of British metalcore." Distorted Sound scored the album 9 out of 10 and said: "WHILE SHE SLEEPS are a band that has the power to use their own awe-inspiring bond to unify the masses. Sleeps Society feels like a welcoming euphoric warm hug. They've built upon the foundations formed from So What? and perfected the formula both sonically and lyrically. It's a magnificent achievement and should be a landmark album for the band. If you want to feel like you're not alone, welcome to the Sleeps Society." Ben Beaumont-Thomas at The Guardian was positive towards the release stating, "Social distancing may soon end, but it's a term that seems to define a UK wracked with problems of loneliness, inequality and division. And with the right to protest also under threat, While She Sleeps' rallying cries for unity and resistance have real potency, and are another example of how the UK's best pop music right now is often its loudest." Paul Travers of Kerrang! considered the release to be "...the familiar riff-fuelled energy and anthemic gang-chant hooks, but season their sonic stew with a few new ingredients."

Writing for Louder Sound, Dannii Leivers calls the album "...a message of self-love: of knowing your worth at a moment when mental health is on its arse and people are full of doubt and fear for the future. All of which makes Sleeps Society an album very much for these troubled times, from a band we can continue to believe in." Sam Dignon of Rock Sins rated the album 8 out of 10 and said: "Still, Sleeps Society is another fantastic album from While She Sleeps that shows how important independence and creative freedom can be for a band. Even if not everything works, it's an album they have poured everything into and every member feels at the top of their game." Wall of Sound gave the album almost a perfect score 9.5/10 and saying: "Sleeps Society manages to be so many things in 11 songs — it's inspiring, furious, dark and emotional to name a few. At the same time, it feels like it's just for you, that the band wrote the album for you and only you. This band is huge, this is their fifth album and it has such a polished sound. But it's still as intimate and personal as a much smaller — earlier into their career- band would release. I can't remember the last time an album felt so personal to me, maybe something from a band I have been a massive fan of for a long time, but to feel an album so personally as a new listener of the band is incredible. I could have done with this album last year while struggling with my mental health, but I have it now, and I know it will help me next time I feel like shit."

It was elected by Loudwire as the 40th best rock/metal album of 2021.

Track listing

Notes
 All track titles are stylised in capital letters. "The End" is stylised as "DN3 3HT".

Personnel
Credits adapted from Discogs.

While She Sleeps
 Lawrence "Loz" Taylor – lead vocals
 Sean Long – lead guitar, backing vocals, synthesizers, engineering, production
 Mat Welsh – rhythm guitar, vocals, piano, artwork
 Aaran McKenzie – bass, backing vocals
 Adam "Sav" Savage – drums, percussion, piano, artwork

Additional musicians
 Simon Neil of Biffy Clyro – guest vocals and guitar on track 4, "Nervous"
 Deryck Whibley of Sum 41 – guest vocals on track 7, "No Defeat for the Brave"
 Sleeps Society – guest vocals on track 10, "Call of the Void"

Additional personnel
 Carl Bown – production, mixing
 Jim Pinder – engineering
 Ste Kerry – mastering
 Eurobroid and Ruby Sanderson – artwork
 Greg Moore – lacquer cut
 While She Sleeps, Giles Smith and Nick Porter – photography

Charts

References

2021 albums
While She Sleeps albums
Search and Destroy Records albums
Spinefarm Records albums